The Stalinist execution list of June 26, 1937 was signed during the Great Purge of the Soviet Union by Joseph Stalin, Lazar Kaganovich, Kliment Voroshilov, Andrei Zhdanov and Anastas Mikoyan.

Notable people on list (in Russian alphabetical order)
11. Matvei Vasilenko, Komkor
16. Ilya Garkavyi, Komkor
17. Anatoliy Gekker, Komkor
20. Boris Gorbachyov, Komkor
82. Sergey Savitsky, divisional commander
90. Semyon Turovsky, Komkor

See also
Stalin's shooting lists

External links

Great Purge